1043 Beate, provisional designation , is a stony asteroid from the outer region of the asteroid belt, approximately 32 kilometers in diameter. It was discovered by German astronomer Karl Reinmuth at the Heidelberg-Königstuhl State Observatory on 22 April 1925. Any reference of its name to a person is unknown.

Orbit and classification 

Beate orbits the Sun in the outer main-belt at a distance of 3.0–3.2 AU once every 5 years and 5 months (1,990 days). Its orbit has an eccentricity of 0.04 and an inclination of 9° with respect to the ecliptic. The asteroid's observation arc begins at the discovering observatory in May 1925, 3 weeks after its official discovery observation.

Physical characteristics 

In the Tholen classification, Beate is a common S-type asteroid.

Rotation period 

In April 2006, a rotational lightcurve of Beate was obtained from photometric observations by American astronomer Brian Warner at his Palmer Divide Observatory in Colorado. It gave a longer-than average rotation period of  hours with a brightness variation of 0.47 magnitude.

Diameter and albedo 

According to the surveys carried out by the Infrared Astronomical Satellite IRAS, the Japanese Akari satellite, and NASA's Wide-field Infrared Survey Explorer with its subsequent NEOWISE mission, Beate measures between 31.6 and 41.0 kilometers in diameter and its surface has an albedo between 0.128 and 0.241. The Collaborative Asteroid Lightcurve Link derives an albedo of 0.2517 and a diameter of 31.85 kilometers with an absolute magnitude of 9.6.

Naming 

For this minor planet, any reference of its name to a person or occurrence is unknown.

Unknown meaning 

Among the many thousands of named minor planets, Beate is one of 120 asteroids, for which no official naming citation has been published.

Notes

References

External links 
 Asteroid Lightcurve Database (LCDB), query form (info )
 Dictionary of Minor Planet Names, Google books
 Asteroids and comets rotation curves, CdR – Observatoire de Genève, Raoul Behrend
 Discovery Circumstances: Numbered Minor Planets (1)-(5000) – Minor Planet Center
 
 

001043
Discoveries by Karl Wilhelm Reinmuth
Named minor planets
001043
19250422